Overhauser may refer to:

 Albert Overhauser (1925–2011), American physicist 
 Chad Overhauser (born 1975), American football player
 Nuclear Overhauser effect, physics concept

Disambiguation pages with surname-holder lists